Clemente José Carlos de Gouvea Isnard, O.S.B.  (July 8, 1917 – August 24, 2011) was a Brazilian bishop of the Roman Catholic Church.

Isnard was born in  Rio de Janeiro, Brazil in 1917 and was ordained a priest on December 19, 1942 of the Order of Saint Benedict. He was appointed Bishop of the Diocese of Nova Friburgo on April 23, 1960 and was ordained bishop July 25, 1960. Isnard remained at the diocese for over 30 years, retiring July 17, 1992.

References

External links
Catholic Hierarchy

1917 births
2011 deaths
20th-century Roman Catholic bishops in Brazil
Participants in the Second Vatican Council
Brazilian Benedictines
Roman Catholic bishops of Nova Friburgo